The 2014 Segundona was the 20th season of the second-tier football league in Angola. The season runs from 27 July to November, 2014. Académica do Lobito the current league champions, were promoted to the 2015 Girabola.

The league comprises 3 series of 6, 5 and 6 teams with the winner of each series being promoted to the 2015 Girabola. At the end of the regular season, the three series winners will play a round-robin tournament to determine the league champion.

All teams play in a double round robin system (home and away).

Serie A

Serie B

Serie C

League title playoff

See also
2014 Girabola

References

External links
Federação Angolana de Futebol

Segundona
2
Angola
Angola